Garden Glacier is in Wenatchee and Mount Baker-Snoqualmie National Forests in the U.S. state of Washington. Garden Glacier is in two sections, located on the south and east slopes of Sinister Peak. The glacier is along the original approach route for the first ascent of Sinister Peak in 1939. Garden Glacier is separated by an arête from Chickamin Glacier to the north.

See also
List of glaciers in the United States

References

Glaciers of the North Cascades
Glaciers of Skagit County, Washington
Glaciers of Washington (state)